Jamesoniella is a genus of liverworts in the family Adelanthaceae. 

The genus was circumscribed by Richard Spruce and Frederick Arnold Lees in London Cat.
Brit. Moss. Hepat. ed.2 on page 25 in 1881 and then in Krypt.-Fl. (Rabenhorst) ed. 3, 6: 858 in 1957.

The genus name of Jamesoniella is in honour of William Jameson (1796–1873) was a Scottish-Ecuadorian botanist.

Species
It contains the following species, as accepted by GBIF;

 Jamesoniella allionii 
 Jamesoniella boliviana 
 Jamesoniella convoluta 
 Jamesoniella fleischeri 
 Jamesoniella fragillima 
 Jamesoniella labrifolia 
 Jamesoniella latifolia 
 Jamesoniella lieboldiana 
 Jamesoniella limbata 
 Jamesoniella minutissima 
 Jamesoniella monodon 
 Jamesoniella papillifolia 
 Jamesoniella perverrucosa 
 Jamesoniella pulchra 
 Jamesoniella rehmannii 
 Jamesoniella rotundifolia 
 Jamesoniella rufescens 
 Jamesoniella undulifolia 
 Jamesoniella verrucosa

References

Jungermanniales
Jungermanniales genera
Taxonomy articles created by Polbot